Palaephatus dimorphus is a moth of the  family Palaephatidae. It is found in much of the southern temperate forests of montane Argentina and Chile.

The length of the forewings is 12–13 mm for males and 13–15 mm for females. Adults have brownish forewings. In males, these are mottled with darker brown to fuscous. Females have whitish buff forewings and similar markings as the males, but the pattern has much
more contrast. They are on wing from September to March, possibly in multiple generations per year.

Etymology
The species name is derived from Greek di (meaning two) and morphe (meaning form) and refers to the distinctive sexual dimorphism of this species.

References

Moths described in 1986
Palaephatidae
Taxa named by Donald R. Davis (entomologist)